The arrondissement of Cahors is an arrondissement of France in the Lot department in the Occitanie région. It has 98 communes.

Composition

The communes of the arrondissement of Cahors, and their INSEE codes, are:
 
 Albas (46001)
 Anglars-Juillac (46005)
 Arcambal (46007)
 Aujols (46010)
 Bach (46013)
 Barguelonne-en-Quercy (46263)
 Beauregard (46020)
 Bélaye (46022)
 Belfort-du-Quercy (46023)
 Bellefont-La Rauze (46156)
 Belmont-Sainte-Foi (46026)
 Berganty (46027)
 Boissières (46032)
 Bouziès (46037)
 Cabrerets (46040)
 Cahors (46042)
 Caillac (46044)
 Calamane (46046)
 Cambayrac (46050)
 Carnac-Rouffiac (46060)
 Cassagnes (46061)
 Castelfranc (46062)
 Castelnau-Montratier-Sainte-Alauzie (46063)
 Catus (46064)
 Cénevières (46068)
 Cézac (46069)
 Cieurac (46070)
 Concots (46073)
 Crayssac (46080)
 Crégols (46081)
 Cremps (46082)
 Douelle (46088)
 Duravel (46089)
 Escamps (46091)
 Esclauzels (46092)
 Espère (46095)
 Flaujac-Poujols (46105)
 Floressas (46107)
 Fontanes (46109)
 Francoulès (46112)
 Gigouzac (46119)
 Grézels (46130)
 Les Junies (46134)
 Labastide-Marnhac (46137)
 Labastide-du-Vert (46136)
 Laburgade (46140)
 Lacapelle-Cabanac (46142)
 Lagardelle (46147)
 Lalbenque (46148)
 Lamagdelaine (46149)
 Laramière (46154)
 Lendou-en-Quercy (46262)
 Lherm (46171)
 Lhospitalet (46172)
 Limogne-en-Quercy (46173)
 Lugagnac (46179)
 Luzech (46182)
 Mauroux (46187)
 Maxou (46188)
 Mechmont (46190)
 Mercuès (46191)
 Le Montat (46197)
 Montcabrier (46199)
 Montcuq-en-Quercy-Blanc (46201)
 Montdoumerc (46202)
 Montgesty (46205)
 Montlauzun (46206)
 Nuzéjouls (46211)
 Parnac (46214)
 Pern (46217)
 Pescadoires (46218)
 Pontcirq (46223)
 Porte-du-Quercy (46033)
 Pradines (46224)
 Prayssac (46225)
 Promilhanes (46227)
 Puy-l'Évêque (46231)
 Saillac (46247)
 Saint-Cirq-Lapopie (46256)
 Saint-Denis-Catus (46264)
 Saint Géry-Vers (46268)
 Saint-Martin-Labouval (46276)
 Saint-Martin-le-Redon (46277)
 Saint-Médard (46280)
 Saint-Paul-Flaugnac (46103)
 Saint-Pierre-Lafeuille (46340)
 Saint-Vincent-Rive-d'Olt (46296)
 Sauzet (46301)
 Sérignac (46305)
 Soturac (46307)
 Tour-de-Faure (46320)
 Touzac (46321)
 Trespoux-Rassiels (46322)
 Varaire (46328)
 Vaylats (46329)
 Vidaillac (46333)
 Villesèque (46335)
 Vire-sur-Lot (46336)

History

The arrondissement of Cahors was created in 1800. At the January 2017 reorganisation of the arrondissements of Lot, it lost two communes to the arrondissement of Figeac and 18 communes to the arrondissement of Gourdon.

As a result of the reorganisation of the cantons of France which came into effect in 2015, the borders of the cantons are no longer related to the borders of the arrondissements. The cantons of the arrondissement of Cahors were, as of January 2015:

 Cahors-Nord-Est
 Cahors-Nord-Ouest
 Cahors-Sud
 Castelnau-Montratier
 Catus
 Cazals
 Lalbenque
 Lauzès
 Limogne-en-Quercy
 Luzech
 Montcuq
 Puy-l'Évêque
 Saint-Géry

References

Cahors